Romário (born 1966) is a Brazilian politician and retired footballer.

Romario may also refer to:

Footballers
 Romário (footballer, born 1985), full name Romário Pereira Sipião, Brazilian footballer
 Romário (footballer, born 1990), full name Romário Vieira Da Silva, Brazilian football midfielder
 Romarinho (footballer, born 1990), full name Romário Ricardo Silva, Brazilian footballer
 Romário (footballer, born 1992), full name Romário Guilherme dos Santos, Brazilian footballer
 Romarinho (footballer, born 1993), full name Romário de Souza Faria Filho, Brazilian footballer, son of the politician and former footballer
 Romarinho (footballer, born 1994), full name José Romário Silva de Souza, Brazilian footballer
 Romário Baldé (born 1996), Bissau-Guinean footballer
 Moses Naserat Romario Banggo (born 1990), Indonesian footballer
 Romário Baró (born 2000), Bissau-Guinean-born Portuguese footballer
 Romario Barthéléry (born 1994), Martiniquais footballer
 Romario Benzar (born 1992), Romanian footballer
 Romario Campbell (born 1989), Jamaican footballer
 Romario Harewood (born 1994), Barbadian footballer
 José Romario Hernández (born 1994), Mexican footballer
 Romario Ibarra (born 1994), Ecuadorian footballer
 Romario Kortzorg (born 1989), Dutch footballer
 Romário Leiria (born 1992), Brazilian footballer
 Romário Pires (born 1989), Brazilian footballer
 Romario Martin (born 1999), Saint Kitts and Nevis footballer
 Romario Moise (born 1995), Romanian footballer
 Romario Piggott (born 1995), Panamanian footballer
 Romario Baggio Rakotoarisoa (born 1996), Malagasy footballer
 Romario da Silva Resende (born 1990), Brazilian footballer
 Romário Ribeiro (born 1989), Brazilian footballer
 Romario Sabajo (born 1989), Dutch footballer
 Romário da Silva Santos (born 1993), Brazilian footballer
 Romario Vieira (born 1998), Bissau-Guinean footballer
 Romário Vieira Da Silva (born 1990), Brazilian footballer playing in Mexico
 Romario Williams (born 1994), Jamaican footballer

Other people
 Romário Leitão (born 1997), São Toméan long distance runner
 Romario Sharma (born 1994), Indian cricketer
 Romario Shepherd (born 1994), Guyanese cricketer
 Romário Xolo Maridueña (born 2001), American actor

See also
 Estádio Romário de Souza Faria, Brazilian football stadium, and home of Duque de Caxias FC